Cold Spring Park Historic District, also known as Wheeler Park, is a national historic district located at Hendersonville, Henderson County, North Carolina.  The district encompasses 37 contributing buildings and 1 contributing structure in a predominantly residential section of Hendersonville developed between 1910 and 1953. It includes notable examples of Colonial Revival and Bungalow / American Craftsman residential architecture.

It was listed on the National Register of Historic Places in 2009.

Gallery

References

Houses on the National Register of Historic Places in North Carolina
Historic districts on the National Register of Historic Places in North Carolina
Colonial Revival architecture in North Carolina
Houses in Henderson County, North Carolina
National Register of Historic Places in Henderson County, North Carolina
Hendersonville, North Carolina